Nokia Balalaika Show is a 1995 promo-only live album by the Leningrad Cowboys and the Red Army Ensemble of a concert performed at Berlin's Lustgarten on 18 June 1994. The concert was also filmed for television broadcast

Track listing

Credits
Introduction by Kirsy Tykkläninen
The Alexandrov Red Army Ensemble conducted by Viktor Federov
Recorded live at Lustgarten, Berlin by Gaga Mobile Studios by Malcom Devenish
Mixed at Hansa Tonstudios, Berlin by Tom Müller
Mastered at T.T.M. Mastering
Produced by Lekka Aarino

References

Leningrad Cowboys albums
1995 live albums